Tessmer is a surname. Notable people with the surname include:

 Eric Tessmer (born 1981), American blues guitarist 
 Estel Tessmer (1910–1972), American football and basketball player
 Jay Tessmer (born 1971), American baseball player

See also
 Tesser